Peruvian Airlines Flight 112 was a domestic scheduled passenger flight from Lima to Jauja in Peru. On 28 March 2017, the aircraft operating the flight suffered undercarriage collapse after landing, caught fire, and was burnt out. While  no fatalities occurred in this accident, 39 of the 150 people on board were injured.

Aircraft
The accident aircraft was a Boeing 737-3M8, msn 25071, registration OB-2036-P. The aircraft had first flown in May 1991 with Trans European Airways and after service with several other airlines was leased by Peruvian Airlines in 2013.

Accident

The aircraft landed at Jauja at 16:40 local time (21:40 UTC). Passengers reported "two strong impacts" on landing. All three landing gear legs collapsed and the aircraft slid along the runway and departed the runway to the right, and the starboard wing hit the airport's perimeter fence. A fire broke out and destroyed the aircraft. All 141 passengers and nine crew on board escaped, of whom 39 people were injured and taken to hospital. Two people sustained broken bones, and three people sustained concussions. The accident was captured by several passengers on board.

Investigations
The Commission for the Investigation of Aviation Accidents, and the Criminal Prosecutor's Office in Jauja both opened investigations into the accident.  

The Commission for the Investigation of Aviation Accidents (CIAA) released its final report on November 2020 and determined that the cause of the accident was a mechanical failure of mechanical components of the shimmy damper systems on both main landing gear struts which, due to being outside tolerances, were not able to correctly dampen the vibrations and lateral oscillations of the wheels causing "shimmy" events. The sequence of shimmy events in both main gear struts led to the fracture and collapse of both main gear struts.

Continental Airlines Flight 603
FedEx Express Flight 910

Notes

References

External links
 Accident Description of Peruvian Airlines Flight 112, Aviation Safety Network

Aviation accidents and incidents in 2017
Aviation accidents and incidents in Peru
Accidents and incidents involving the Boeing 737 Classic
2017 in Peru
March 2017 events in South America